Solanum bulbocastanum, the ornamental nightshade, is a plant in the family Solanaceae, native to Mexico and parts of the U.S. Southwest.  It is closely related to the potato and, as it has evolved strong resistance to all known varieties of potato blight, has been used to genetically engineer resistance into the cultivated varieties of potatoes around the world.  The use of genetic engineering is helpful, as efforts to hybridize by traditional methods have so far been unsuccessful, and the use of somatic hybridization to transfer genes is difficult. A resistance to the Columbia root-knot nematode Meloidogyne chitwoodi has been identified in S. bulbocastanum, which can be transferred to cultivated potato.

References

External links
 Solanum bulbocastanum Dunal on Solanaceae Source — Images, description, specimens and a full list of scientific synonyms.

bulbocastanum